Melbourne tram route 24 was operated by Yarra Trams on the Melbourne tram network from Balwyn North to La Trobe Street West End in the Melbourne CBD. The 12.6 kilometre route was operated out of Kew depot with A and C class trams.

Route 24 began operating on 25 September 1972 as a peak hour derivative of route 48. Between 23 May and 18 November 2005 it was extended via Docklands to Flinders Street West while the King Street Overpass was demolished.

The route was discontinued on 26 July 2014 as part of a wider timetable change to the Yarra Trams network. It only operated in peak hours.

Route map

References

External links

024